Presidential elections were held in Brazil on 3 October 1955. The result was a victory for Juscelino Kubitschek, who received 35.7% of the vote. Voter turnout was 59.7%.

Background
After the suicide of Getúlio Vargas, his Vice President João Café Filho took office. Prior to Vargas' death, Brazil was living a time of intense political division, with the right-wing opposition National Democratic Union (UDN), high-level military officers and the mass media openly trying to depose him following the attempted assassination of right-wing journalist Carlos Lacerda, allegedly ordered by Vargas.

Juscelino Kubitschek, then Governor of Minas Gerais and a member of the pro-Vargas Social Democratic Party (PSD) announced his candidacy and built an alliance with the popular left-wing populist João Goulart of Vargas' Brazilian Labour Party (PTB), who was Vargas' former Minister of Labour and personal friend and who became cherished by the workers after granting a 100% increase in the minimum wage. A PSD-PTB coalition was then formed, with Kubitscheck as the presidential candidate and Goulart as his running mate.

The UDN, which wanted to do a more moderate and centrist image launched the candidacy of Juarez Távora, an old military officer. The party formed a multi-party coalition in order to defeat the PSD-PTB coalition, a coalition which included the Republican Party and the Christian Democratic Party.

The Social Progressive Party (PSP) candidate was its leader, the populist former São Paulo Governor Adhemar de Barros. The PSP had supported Vargas in 1950, helping him win, but Adhemar was known to have presidential ambitions of his own.

Also on the right, Plínio Salgado of the minor Party of Popular Representation (PRP) ran for president. Salgado was known for being the leader of Brazilian Integralism in the late 1930s and early 1940s. Integralismo was a far right movement described as a Brazilian branch of fascism.

During the campaign, Luís Carlos Prestes, leader of then illegal Brazilian Communist Party (PCB) recommended the tactical vote for the Kubitschek-Goulart ticket, an incident which increased the communist denunciations of the UDN and the media against the PSD-PTB campaign.

Candidates
Governor Juscelino Kubitschek of Minas Gerais (PSD)
Former Agriculture Minister Juarez Távora of Ceará (UDN)
Former Governor Adhemar de Barros of São Paulo (PSP)
Plínio Salgado (PRP)

Results

President

Vice-President

References

Presidential elections in Brazil
Brazil
Presidential